Služanj is a village located in Herzegovina, in southern Bosnia and Herzegovina.  It is a municipality of the Herzegovina-Neretva Canton in the Federation of Bosnia and Herzegovina. It is within Čitluk county.

The town is nearby the world-famous Marian Shrine of Međugorje which is located just to the south of the town of Čitluk.

Settlement Parts
There are two parts of town:
- 1. Gornja Mala/Baščina - Bradvice, Dugandžići, Milićevići, Leske.
- 2. Donja Mala - Juke, Turudići, Bradvice, obitelj Antunović, Vučići

Demographics

1991
In 1991, the municipality had a population of few thousands people, of which there were 544 Croats (98.9%) and 17 Yugoslavs (1.1%).

2013
According to the 2013 census, its population was 897, all Croats.

Sports
This is the birth town of popular Croatian footballer Zvonimir Soldo, who works in Cologne in Germany.

References

External links 
Municipality of Služanj 

Populated places in Čitluk, Bosnia and Herzegovina